Policarpo "Poli" Díaz Arevalo (born November 21, 1967) is a Spanish former professional boxer who competed from 1986 to 2001. He held the European lightweight title from 1988 to 1991, and challenged for the unified WBA, WBC and IBF lightweight title in 1991. 

In July 1991, he fought for the lightweight world championship against Pernell Whitaker, but he was defeated by decision after 12 rounds. Before this fight, Diaz had 32 wins and 0 losses, and 28 KO's after being eight times European champion.

External links 

Living people
1967 births
Spanish male boxers
Lightweight boxers
European Boxing Union champions
Sportspeople from Madrid